The following outline is provided as an overview of and topical guide to the Czech Republic:

The Czech Republic (also known as Czechia) is a landlocked country in Central Europe. On 1 January 1993, Czechoslovakia peacefully dissolved into its constituent states, the Czech Republic and Slovakia. The Czech Republic is bordered by Poland to the north, Germany to the west, Austria to the south and Slovakia to the east. Its capital and largest city, with 1.3 million inhabitants, is Prague. It is a pluralist multi-party parliamentary representative democracy, a member of the European Union, NATO, the OECD, the OSCE, the Council of Europe, and the Visegrád Group.

General reference

 Pronunciation: 
 Czech Republic 
 Czechia 
 Common English country name: The Czech Republic
 Official short English country name: Czechia
 Official long English country name: The Czech Republic
 Common endonym(s): Česko
 Official endonym(s): Česká republika
 Adjective(s): Czech
 Demonym(s): Czechs
 Etymology: Name of the Czech Republic
 International rankings of the Czech Republic
 ISO country codes: CZ, CZE, 203
 ISO region codes: See ISO 3166-2:CZ
 Internet country code top-level domain: .cz

Geography of the Czech Republic

Geography of the Czech Republic
 The Czech Republic is: a landlocked country
 Location:
 Northern Hemisphere and Eastern Hemisphere
 Eurasia
 Europe
 Central Europe
 Time zone: Central European Time (UTC+01), Central European Summer Time (UTC+02)
 Extreme points of the Czech Republic
 High: Sněžka 
 Low: Elbe 
 Land boundaries: 1,989 km
 815 km
 615 km
 362 km
 197 km

 Coastline: none
 Population of the Czech Republic: 10 572 427 (as of September 30, 2016)
 Area of the Czech Republic: 78,866 km2 (30,450 sq mi), 116th in the world
 Atlas of the Czech Republic

Environment of the Czech Republic

 Climate of the Czech Republic
 Renewable energy in the Czech Republic
 Protected areas of the Czech Republic
 Biosphere reserves in the Czech Republic
 National parks of the Czech Republic
 Wildlife of the Czech Republic
 Fauna of the Czech Republic
 Birds of the Czech Republic
 Mammals of the Czech Republic

Natural geographic features of the Czech Republic
 Glaciers of the Czech Republic
 Lakes of the Czech Republic
 Mountains of the Czech Republic
 Volcanoes in the Czech Republic
 Rivers of the Czech Republic
 Waterfalls of the Czech Republic
 Valleys of the Czech Republic
 World Heritage Sites in the Czech Republic

Ecoregions of the Czech Republic

List of ecoregions in the Czech Republic

Administrative divisions of the Czech Republic
 Administrative divisions of the Czech Republic

Regions and districts of the Czech Republic
 Regions of the Czech Republic
 Districts of the Czech Republic

Municipalities of the Czech Republic
 Capital of the Czech Republic: Prague (outline)
 Cities of the Czech Republic
 List of twin towns and sister cities in the Czech Republic

Demography of the Czech Republic

Demographics of the Czech Republic

Government and politics of the Czech Republic

Politics of the Czech Republic
 Form of government: unitary parliamentary representative democratic republic
 Capital of the Czech Republic: Prague
 Elections in the Czech Republic
 Political parties in the Czech Republic

Branches of the government of the Czech Republic

Executive branch of the government of the Czech Republic
 Head of state: President
 Head of government: Prime Minister
 Cabinet of the Czech Republic

Legislative branch of the government of the Czech Republic
 Parliament of the Czech Republic (bicameral)
 Upper house: Senate
 Lower house: Chamber of Deputies

Judicial branch of the government of the Czech Republic

Judiciary of the Czech Republic
 Constitutional Court of the Czech Republic
 Supreme Court of the Czech Republic
 Supreme Administrative Court of the Czech Republic

Foreign relations of the Czech Republic

Foreign relations of the Czech Republic
 Diplomatic missions in the Czech Republic
 Diplomatic missions of the Czech Republic

International organization membership
The Czech Republic is a member of:

 Australia Group
 Bank for International Settlements (BIS)
 Black Sea Economic Cooperation Zone (BSEC) (observer)
 Central European Initiative (CEI)
 Confederation of European Paper Industries (CEPI)
 Council of Europe (CE)
 Euro-Atlantic Partnership Council (EAPC)
 European Bank for Reconstruction and Development (EBRD)
 European Investment Bank (EIB)
 European Organization for Nuclear Research (CERN)
 European Space Agency (ESA) (cooperating state)
 European Union (EU)
 Food and Agriculture Organization (FAO)
 International Atomic Energy Agency (IAEA)
 International Bank for Reconstruction and Development (IBRD)
 International Chamber of Commerce (ICC)
 International Civil Aviation Organization (ICAO)
 International Criminal Court (ICCt) (signatory)
 International Criminal Police Organization (Interpol)
 International Development Association (IDA)
 International Energy Agency (IEA)
 International Federation of Red Cross and Red Crescent Societies (IFRCS)
 International Finance Corporation (IFC)
 International Labour Organization (ILO)
 International Maritime Organization (IMO)
 International Mobile Satellite Organization (IMSO)
 International Monetary Fund (IMF)
 International Olympic Committee (IOC)
 International Organization for Migration (IOM)
 International Organization for Standardization (ISO)
 International Red Cross and Red Crescent Movement (ICRM)
 International Telecommunication Union (ITU)
 International Telecommunications Satellite Organization (ITSO)

 International Trade Union Confederation (ITUC)
 Inter-Parliamentary Union (IPU)
 Multilateral Investment Guarantee Agency (MIGA)
 Nonaligned Movement (NAM) (guest)
 North Atlantic Treaty Organization (NATO)
 Nuclear Energy Agency (NEA)
 Nuclear Suppliers Group (NSG)
 Organisation internationale de la Francophonie (OIF) (observer)
 Organisation for Economic Co-operation and Development (OECD)
 Organization for Security and Cooperation in Europe (OSCE)
 Organisation for the Prohibition of Chemical Weapons (OPCW)
 Organization of American States (OAS) (observer)
 Permanent Court of Arbitration (PCA)
 Schengen Convention
 United Nations (UN)
 United Nations Conference on Trade and Development (UNCTAD)
 United Nations Educational, Scientific, and Cultural Organization (UNESCO)
 United Nations Industrial Development Organization (UNIDO)
 United Nations Mission in Liberia (UNMIL)
 United Nations Observer Mission in Georgia (UNOMIG)
 United Nations Organization Mission in the Democratic Republic of the Congo (MONUC)
 Universal Postal Union (UPU)
 Western European Union (WEU) (associate)
 World Confederation of Labour (WCL)
 World Customs Organization (WCO)
 World Federation of Trade Unions (WFTU)
 World Health Organization (WHO)
 World Intellectual Property Organization (WIPO)
 World Meteorological Organization (WMO)
 World Tourism Organization (UNWTO)
 World Trade Organization (WTO)
 World Veterans Federation
 Zangger Committee (ZC)

Law and order in the Czech Republic

Law of the Czech Republic
 Cannabis in the Czech Republic
 Capital punishment in the Czech Republic
 Constitution of the Czech Republic
 Crime in the Czech Republic
 Human rights in the Czech Republic
 LGBT rights in the Czech Republic
 Freedom of religion in the Czech Republic
 Law enforcement in the Czech Republic

Military of the Czech Republic

Military of the Czech Republic
 Command
 Commander-in-chief:
 Ministry of Defence of the Czech Republic
 Forces
 Army of the Czech Republic
 Navy of the Czech Republic: None (it's a landlocked country)
 Air Force of the Czech Republic
 Special forces of the Czech Republic
 Military history of the Czech Republic
 Military ranks of the Czech Republic

Local government in the Czech Republic

Local government in the Czech Republic

History of the Czech Republic

History of the Czech Republic
 Military history of the Czech Republic

Culture of the Czech Republic

Culture of the Czech Republic
 Architecture of the Czech Republic
Czech Baroque architecture
Czech Gothic architecture
Czech Renaissance architecture
 Cuisine of the Czech Republic
 Beer in the Czech Republic
 Languages of the Czech Republic
 Media in the Czech Republic
 Museums in the Czech Republic
 National symbols of the Czech Republic
 Coat of arms of the Czech Republic
 Flag of the Czech Republic
 National anthem of the Czech Republic
 People of the Czech Republic
 Lists of Czechs
 Prostitution in the Czech Republic
 Public holidays in the Czech Republic
 Religion in the Czech Republic
 Buddhism in the Czech Republic
 Christianity in the Czech Republic
 Hinduism in the Czech Republic
 Islam in the Czech Republic
 Judaism in the Czech Republic
 Sikhism in the Czech Republic
 World Heritage Sites in the Czech Republic
 Youth in the Czech Republic

Art in the Czech Republic
 Cinema of the Czech Republic
 Karlovy Vary International Film Festival
 Literature of the Czech Republic
 Music of the Czech Republic
 List of Czech musical groups
 Television in the Czech Republic
 List of original shows by TV Nova (Czech Republic)
 Theatre of the Czech Republic
 National Theatre (Prague)
 Visual arts of the Czech Republic
 Czech Cubism
 Decorative arts in the Czech Republic
 Bohemian glass
 Museum of Decorative Arts in Prague

Sports in the Czech Republic

Sports in the Czech Republic
 Football in the Czech Republic
 Czech Republic at the Olympics
 Motor sports in the Czech Republic
 Czechoslovakian Grand Prix – a Formula One motor race
 Czech Republic motorcycle Grand Prix
 Speedway Grand Prix of Czech Republic
 Rugby league in the Czech Republic

Economy and infrastructure of the Czech Republic

Economy of the Czech Republic
 Economic rank, by (PPP) per capita GDP (2012): 35th in world
 Economic rank, by nominal GDP (2007): 39th in world
 Communications in the Czech Republic
 Internet in the Czech Republic
 List of radio stations in the Czech Republic
 Television in the Czech Republic
 Companies of the Czech Republic
 Currency of the Czech Republic: Koruna
 ISO 4217: CZK
 Energy in the Czech Republic
 Tourism in the Czech Republic
 Transport in the Czech Republic
 List of Czech cars
 Airports in the Czech Republic
 Rail transport in the Czech Republic

Education in the Czech Republic

Education in the Czech Republic
 List of schools in the Czech Republic
 List of universities in the Czech Republic

Health in the Czech Republic
 Health in the Czech Republic

See also

Czech Republic
 List of Czech Republic-related topics
 List of international rankings
 Member state of the European Union
 Member state of the North Atlantic Treaty Organization
 Member state of the United Nations
 Outline of Europe
 Outline of geography
 Spa towns in the Czech Republic

References

External links

 Czech Republic

 Government
 Government of the Czech Republic
 Prague Castle, an official site of the prezident

 Parliament
 Chamber of Deputies
 Senate

 News
 Czech Happenings, a website of Czech News Agency (CTK)
 Prague Daily Monitor
 The Prague Post
 The Prague Tribune
 Radio Prague

 Statistics
 Czech Statistical Office

 Photos
 Photos of the Czech republic

 Travelling
 CzechTourism

Czech Republic